Alfonso de Fonseca (1422–1505) was a Roman Catholic prelate who served as Bishop of Osma (1493–1505), Bishop of Cuenca (1485–1493), and Bishop of Ávila (1469–1485).

Biography
Alfonso was the first son of Pedro de Ulloa y Fonesca and Isabel de Quijada.

On 29 January 1469, in order to thank his services to the Spanish crown, Alfonso was appointed by the King of Spain and confirmed by Pope Paul II as Bishop of Ávila. On 25 February 1470, he was ordained bishop by Giacopo Antonio Venier, Bishop of Cuenca; Giovanni Gianderoni, Bishop of Città di Castello; and Corrado Marcellini, Bishop of Montefeltro.  On 26 August 1485, he was appointed by Pope Innocent VIII as Bishop of Cuenca. On 24 May 1493, he was appointed by Pope Alexander VI as Bishop of Osma, where he served until his death in 1505.

References

External links and additional sources
 (for Chronology of Bishops) 
 (for Chronology of Bishops) 
 (for Chronology of Bishops) 
 (for Chronology of Bishops) 
 (for Chronology of Bishops) 
 (for Chronology of Bishops) 

1505 deaths
15th-century Roman Catholic bishops in Castile
Bishops appointed by Pope Paul II
Bishops appointed by Pope Innocent VIII
Bishops appointed by Pope Alexander VI
1422 births